Corning is a surname. Notable people with the surname include:

Edwin Corning (1883–1934), American businessman and politician
Erastus Corning (1794–1872), American businessman and politician
Erastus Corning 2nd (1909–1983), mayor of Albany, New York
Howard Corning (1879–1924), Canadian cattle farmer and politician
Joy Corning (1932–2017), American politician
Parker Corning (1874–1943), U.S. Representative from New York
Peter Corning (born 1935), American biologist, consultant, and complex systems scientist
Ron Corning (born 1971) American television host
Thomas Corning (1842–1912), Canadian lawyer and politician